Padmini Devi (born as Princess Padmini Devi of Sirmur; 21 September 1943) is the titular Rajmata of Jaipur.

Early life 
Ethnically born into the royal family of the Sirmur, her father, Maharaja Rajendra Prakash of Sirmur, presently in Himachal Pradesh, was the ruler of Sirmur from 1933-1964. Her mother was Indira Devi, the daughter of Maharaja Thakore Bahadursinhji Mansinhji of Palitana. She received convent education in Mussoorie and then spent time at finishing schools in London and Switzerland.

She heads Maharaja Sawai Man Singh II Museum as a chairperson. She takes a keen interest in the social activities and welfare of the people of Jaipur in Rajasthan.

Personal life

Marriage 
She married Bhawani Singh, eldest son of Maharaja Sawai Man Singh II of Jaipur and his first wife, Maharani Marudhar Kanwar on 10 March 1966 in a ceremony held at Delhi.

Children 
Her only child, a daughter, Diya Kumari, is member of Indian Parliament from Rajsamand parliamentary seat, and a member of the Bharatiya Janata Party.

Grandchildren 

Her only child and daughter, Princess Diya Kumari married to Maharaj Narendra Singh, a commoner and had 3 children with him. Maharaja Sawai Padmanabh Singh Of Jaipur who is the current titular king of Jaipur and an established polo player, Princess Gauravi Kumari Of Jaipur who is a feminist also the general secretary of PDKF and Maharaja Lakshraj Prakash Singh Of Sirmaur who is the titular king of Sirmaur from where Rajmata belongs to. Rajmata Padmini Devi became maternal grandmother-nani to these children.

References 

1943 births
Living people
People from Sirmaur district
Queen mothers
Politicians from Jaipur
Women in Rajasthan politics
20th-century Indian women